KIWR (89.7 FM) is a radio station broadcasting an Alternative format. Based in Council Bluffs, Iowa, United States, the station serves the Omaha Metro area. The station is licensed to Iowa Western Community College. The station has broadcast alternative rock since January 1, 1996. Prior to that, it played Classical music and Jazz.

Nelly's Hot & Spicy Morning Fiasco
Hosted by Nelson with assistance from no one, weekday mornings 6 am to 10 am, 
Call for any questions or concerns, (712)328-8970.

Skinman
After the Morning Fiasco, it’s Middays with Tom "Skinman" Skinner from 10 am to 2 pm Monday through Thursday and 10 am to 12 pm on Friday. Skinman has an all request hour from Noon to 1 pm called "The Nooner". On Wednesday, The river takes it back from Noon to 2 pm for " The Old Skool Wednesday Nooner" playing popular hits from the 70's, 80's, 90's and more.

Nothing But Covers
On Friday, Sophia John has created a highly popular covers show where she plays only cover songs from Noon to 2 pm.

Amplified Afternoons
At the end of Middays, Corey and a student producer step in for Amplified Afternoons, weekday afternoons from 2 pm to 6 pm, which includes segments like "Wack Attack", stories about crazy fights and attacks; "the 4 @ 4:00", everyday a listener gets to hear his or her four song choices; "Daily Flight to Florida", Bizarre news stories from Florida; "Nude Dude", stories about naked men (and sometimes women) that make the news; and Road Rage, which is all request music from 5 pm to 6 pm, with the Daily Dose of Metallica at 5:30 pm.

Weeknight and weekend programming
From 6 pm to 3 am  Monday through Friday and Saturdays 6 am to Midnight, students attending the Media Studies Program at Iowa Western Community College start their shifts. Weeknights at 7 pm the student DJ plays a new song for a segment called "Turn it or Burn it", where the River listeners get to decide whether or not the station keeps playing the featured song. 89.7 The River has always been a learning tool for students attending the media studies program at IWCC.

Specialty shows
KIWR hosts several "spotlight" radio programs that are not subsets of the regular programming. This includes the 29-year-old Pacific Street Blues which airs Sunday's from 9:00 am to Noon. The Pacific Street Blues & Americana radio program was awarded a KBA or Keeping the Blues Alive award in 2010. PSB&A host, Rick Galusha, has been nominated to the Nebraska Rock n' Roll Hall of Fame. Portions of PSB&A have aired on several English radio stations over the years. Podcasts of the program can be heard online (https://anchor.fm/pacific-street-blues-and-americana)  Other specialty and syndicated programs include Skratch N Sniff, Subterranean, The Freak Factory, the heavy metal outlet Sunday School, Acoustic Café, Mountain Stage(the station's only NPR program), New Day Rising, Passport Approved, Planet O (local/regional music),   Keller's Cellar, and the Grateful Dead hour.

Signal

KIWR's signal is receivable in Omaha and Council Bluffs (The two being the local listening area) and also receivable in Lincoln. Under the right conditions, the station can be heard as far away as Burlington, Iowa.

Festivals

August 9, 2005 - River Riot: 311, Breaking Benjamin, Unwritten Law, Danko Jones, No Address, Grasshopper Takeover, Emphatic
July 30, 2006 - River Riot: 311, Dashboard Confessional*, Yellowcard, Hawthorne Heights, Blue October, The Wailers, Matchbook Romance, Say Anything, Pepper, Swizzle Tree, Agent Sparxx, Jazzwholes (Dashboard Confessional cancelled the day of the concert)
July 21, 2007 - River Riot: Incubus, Hinder, Papa Roach, Buckcherry, Fuel, The Exies,  Simon Dawes
August 2, 2008 - River Riot: 3 Doors Down, Staind, Seether, Filter, Finger Eleven, Sick Puppies,  SafetySuit
August 14, 2009 - Rockfest: Korn, Mudvayne, Black Label Society, Static-X, Suicide Silence, Bury Your Dead, Burn Halo, After Midnight Project
August 16, 2009 - River Riot: Blink-182, Fall Out Boy, Panic! at the Disco, Chester French, Rehab, Dirty Little Rabbits, Pomeroy
May 14, 2010 - Rockfest: Godsmack, Rob Zombie, Alice Cooper, Hellyeah, Papa Roach, Skillet, Halestorm, Dirtfedd
August 14, 2010 - River Riot: Stone Temple Pilots, Weezer, Blue October, Cage the Elephant, Emphatic, Flobots, Paper Tongues, Something To Burn
May 13, 2011 - Rockfest: Stone Sour, Seether, Hollywood Undead, 10 Years, Escape the Fate, My Darkest Days, Screaming for Silence
September 23, 2011 - River Riot: Avenged Sevenfold, Three Days Grace, Sick Puppies, Bullet for My Valentine, Escape the Fate, Sevendust, Hell Or Highwater
May 12, 2012 - Rockfest: Incubus, Shinedown, Five Finger Death Punch, Emphatic, After the Fall
August 17, 2012 - River Riot: Knotfest: Slipknot, Deftones, Serj Tankian, Prong, Lamb of God, Machine Head, Dethklok, The Urge, Dirtfedd
May 11, 2013 - Rockfest: Blue October, Trapt, Taproot, Smile Empty Soul, 10 Years, Sick Puppies, Hollywood Undead, HURT, IAMDYNAMITE
May 30, 2014 - Rockfest: Five Finger Death Punch, Black Label Society, HELLYEAH, Killswitch Engage, Sick Puppies, Escape the Fate, Emphatic, Gemini Syndrome
May 29, 2015 - Rockfest: Papa Roach, Halestorm, The Pretty Reckless (withdrew right before performance), In This Moment, Starset, We Are Harlot, Emphatic, Arson City, Screaming for Silence
June 2, 2015 - No Coast Fest: Cage the Elephant, Bleachers, Joywave, Icky Blossoms, Saint Motel, In The Valley Below
May 13, 2016 - Rockfest: Rob Zombie, Lamb of God, Clutch, Atreyu, HELLYEAH, Parkway Drive, Corrosion of Conformity, Radkey, Narcotic Self, Matador
August 19, 2016 - River Riot: Volbeat, Killswitch Engage, Sick Puppies, Hatebreed, Sevendust, Walls of Jericho, Holy White Hounds, Crobot, Westfield Massacre, Bloodcow *(Cancelled due to weather)
May 12, 2017 - Rockfest: Soundgarden, Papa Roach, The Pretty Reckless, Pierce The Veil, Sum 41, The Dillinger Escape Plan, Biffy Clyro, Through Fire
May 10, 2019 - River Riot: Halestorm, In This Moment, I Prevail, Sevendust, Through Fire, Palaye Royale, Beasto Blanco, The Impulsive
October 14, 2019 - Mega Fest: Dropkick Murphy’s, Clutch, The Interrupters, Fever 333, The Urge, Hatebreed, Amigo the Devil, Killigans *(Cancelled due to weather)

May 16, 2020 - River Riot: Hollywood Undead, Bad Wolves, From Ashes To New, Yelawolf, Royal Bliss, Venaculas, Screaming For Silence, Discrepancies, Devil in the Details *(Cancelled due to COVID-19)

August 14, 2021 - River Riot: Halestorm, 10 Years, Through Fire, Venaculas, Royal Bliss, Saul, Screaming for Silence, Discrepancies, Devil in the Details
August 6, 2022 - River Riot: Rob Zombie, Mudvayne, Static-X, Powerman 5000, Through Fire, The Tale Untold
August 20, 2022 - Rockfest: Alice In Chains, Breaking Benjamin, Bush, The L.I.F.E Project, Messer, Arson City

References

External links
89.7 The River Website
Pacific Street Blues archive

IWR
Council Bluffs, Iowa
NPR member stations